Curtain Call: The Hits is the first greatest hits album by American rapper Eminem. It was released on December 6, 2005, under Shady Records, Aftermath Entertainment, and Interscope Records. The album collects Eminem's most popular singles, as well as four new songs, including a live version of "Stan", featuring English singer-songwriter Elton John performed at the 43rd Grammy Awards, plus the songs "Fack", "When I'm Gone" and "Shake That" featuring Nate Dogg. 

The album was certified Diamond in the United States on March 8, 2022 and quintuple platinum in New Zealand. It reached number one on several charts, including the US Billboard 200 and UK Albums Chart. 

On July 11, 2022, Eminem announced a sequel to the album titled Curtain Call 2, which would contain material from his later work. It was released on August 5, 2022.

Chart performance
Curtain Call: The Hits debuted at number one on the UK Albums Chart and Billboard 200, after two sales days, in a similar fashion to Eminem's previous album Encore. The album racked up first-week sales of nearly 441,000 and with close to 324,000 scans the second week for a two-week stay at number one. It slipped from number one to number four in its third week but surged 33 percent to finish with sales close to 430,000. The disc scored nearly 1.2 million scans in its first three weeks of release. It also gave Eminem his fifth straight number 1 album in the US and UK including the 8 Mile soundtrack. , the record had sold 3,782,000 copies in the United States. Curtain Call was later certified Diamond by the RIAA in the United States.

The album's two singles, "When I'm Gone" and "Shake That", peaked at numbers 8 and 6 respectively in the US Billboard Hot 100. Only "When I'm Gone" qualified for the charts in the UK, where it peaked at #4.

In August 2017, the album was declared the longest-running rap LP in the history of the Billboard 200.

Clean version
A clean version of the album is also available. It has 15 tracks with both "Intro" and "FACK" removed (due to the extreme sexual nature of the latter, and the former's connection to the song) and "My Name Is" put to track one. The tracks appear exactly how they appeared on the clean versions of their respective albums except for the song "Guilty Conscience", which uses the radio edit. Certain profanities remain on several tracks, as words including "shit", "bitch", and "ass" were not censored on The Slim Shady LP or The Marshall Mathers LP. However, on "Just Lose It", the clean version leaves "ass" uncensored, while on the album Encore, the word "ass" was replaced with "thing".

Track listing 

Notes
 signifies an additional producer.
 signifies a co-producer.

Personnel 

 Jeff Bass – bass, guitar, keyboard
 Karin Catt – photography
 Larry Chatman – project coordinator
 Lindsay Collins – studio coordinator
 Tommy Coster – keyboard
 DJ Head – drum programming
 Dr. Dre – producer, mixing
 Eminem – producer, executive producer, drum programming, mixing
 The 45 King & Louie – producer
 Marti Frederiksen – engineer
 Brian "Big Bass" Gardener – mastering
 Scott Hays – assistant engineer
 Richard "Segal" Herredia – engineer
 Mauricio Iragorri – engineer
 Ben Jost – assistant engineer
 Rouble Kapoor – assistant engineer
 Steven King – bass, guitar, engineer, mixing
 Anthony Mandler – photography
 Jonathan Mannion – photography
 Joe Perry – guitar solo on "Sing for the Moment"
 Kirdis Postelle – project coordinator
 Luis Resto – keyboard, programming, producer
 Tom Rounds – assistant engineer
 Les Scurry – production coordination
 Mike Sroka – assistant engineer
 Urban Kris – assistant engineer
 Nitin Vadukul – photography

Charts

Weekly charts

Year-end charts

Decade-end charts

Certifications

See also 
 List of best-selling albums in Australia

References

External links 
 

Eminem compilation albums
2005 greatest hits albums
Albums produced by Dr. Dre
Albums produced by Eminem
Aftermath Entertainment compilation albums
Aftermath Entertainment albums
Shady Records compilation albums